IPSC Kyrgyzstan is the Kyrgyz association for practical shooting under the International Practical Shooting Confederation.

References 

Regions of the International Practical Shooting Confederation
Sports organisations of Kyrgyzstan